Yasmin Angoe is a Ghanaian-American writer, known for her novel Her Name is Knight (2021), published by Thomas & Mercer.

Prior to becoming a full-time writer, she taught middle and high school English. She and her husband moved to South Carolina in 2009.

References

Living people
Year of birth missing (living people)
Place of birth missing (living people)
21st-century American novelists
American people of Ghanaian descent
African-American women writers
Writers from South Carolina